Bekalta,, is a Tunisian coastal town, around 30 km. south of Monastir and around 14 km. northeast of Mahdia. The main activities of the local population are agriculture and fishing. It gives its name to the Baklouti pepper.

See also 
 Thapsus
 Tunisia
 Monastir Governorate

External links 
 
 Personal blogs related to Bekalta: bekalta.unblog.fr
 

Populated places in Monastir Governorate
Communes of Tunisia